The World Strategic Forum is an annual economic event organized by the International Economic Forum of the Americas since 2011.

Mission
The World Strategic Forum is a not-for-profit organization whose mission is to address the major governance challenges and to foster dialogues on national and global issues by bringing together heads of state, the private sector, international organizations and civil society. It also attempts to foster exchanges of information, to promote free discussion on major current economic issues and facilitate meetings between world leaders.

The Forum brings together more than 1,400 people from across the globe, every year.

History
The first Forum was presented in 2011 and was held in Palm Beach, Florida, until 2014. The subsequent editions, as of 2015, are held in Miami, Florida.

Notable speakers
See source

Advisory board

Chair
Eduardo J. Padrón, President, Miami Dade College

Members
Current members of the Advisory Board of the World Strategic Forum are:

See also
International Economic Forum of the Americas
Conference of Montreal
Toronto Global Forum

References

External links
 International Economic Forum of the Americas
 Conference of Montreal
 Toronto Global Forum
 World Strategic Forum

International conferences
International conferences in the United States
Business conferences
Global economic conferences